Mark Matthew Connelly (March 21, 1879 – May 5, 1955) was an Irish-born merchant and politician in British Columbia. He represented Omineca in the Legislative Assembly of British Columbia from 1936 to 1945 as a Liberal.

In 1913, he came to Enderby, British Columbia, where he operated a general store and hotel. In 1918, Connelly, a widower, married Mabel Ester Gilmour. Connelly later moved to Fraser Lake, where he was involved in the lumber business and also owned a hotel. He was first elected to the provincial assembly in a 1936 by-election held after Alexander Malcolm Manson resigned his seat to run unsuccessfully for a seat in the Canadian House of Commons. He was defeated by Edward Fraser Rowland when he ran for reelection in 1945. Connelly served as whip for the Liberal-Conservative coalition in the assembly. He died on May 5, 1955 in Palm Springs, California after retiring from business.

References 

1879 births
1955 deaths
British Columbia Liberal Party MLAs
Irish emigrants to Canada (before 1923)
Businesspeople from Palm Springs, California
Politicians from Galway (city)